Sierra Norte de Sevilla may refer to various places in Spain:
Sierra Norte de Sevilla, a mountain range of the Sierra Morena system
Sierra Norte de Sevilla (Vino de la Tierra), a Spanish geographical indication for Vino de la Tierra wines 
Sierra Norte de Sevilla Comarca, a comarca in Sevilla Province